The 2015 French Road Cycling Cup was the 24th edition of the French Road Cycling Cup and was won by Nacer Bouhanni.

Compared to the previous edition, the Châteauroux Classic and the Tour de la Somme had been replaced by the Grand Prix de Fourmies and La Roue Tourangelle. The defending champion from the last season was Julien Simon.

Events

Final Points standings

Individual
In order to be eligible for the classification, riders either had to be French or competed for a French-licensed team.

Young rider classification
In order to be eligible for the classification, riders had to be younger than 25 and either had to be French or competed for a French-licensed team.

Teams
Only French teams are eligible to be classified in the teams classification.

External links
  Official website

French Road Cycling Cup
French Road Cycling Cup
2015 in French sport